Daniel Man (born 29 June 1994) is a former Hong Kong professional footballer who plays for Lucky Mile.

Club career
Man started his career with Spanish seventh tier side Marbella United FC B. Before the second half of 2015–16, he signed for San Pedro B in the Spanish sixth tier. In 2016, Man signed for Hong Kong top flight club HKFC, where he made 19 league appearances and scored 1 goal. On 9 September 2016, he debuted for HKFC during a 1–2 loss to Tai Po. On 17 February 2017, Man scored his first goal for HKFC during a 3–4 loss to R&F. Before the second half of 2019–20, he signed for Sham Shui Po in the Hong Kong second tier.

International career
Man was eligible to represent Wales internationally.

References

External links
 Daniel Man at playmakerstats.com

1994 births
Living people
Association football midfielders
Expatriate footballers in Spain
Hong Kong expatriate footballers
Hong Kong FC players
Hong Kong footballers
Welsh footballers
Hong Kong people of Welsh descent
Hong Kong Premier League players
Hong Kong First Division League players
Lee Man FC players
Sham Shui Po SA players